Puerta 7 is an Argentinian crime drama thriller web television series created by Martin Zimmerman and starring Dolores Fonzi, Esteban Lamothe and Carlos Belloso. The plot revolves around football fans dealing drugs and causing fatalities at football matches.

It premiered on Netflix on February 21, 2020.

Cast
 Dolores Fonzi as Diana
 Esteban Lamothe as Fabián
 Juan Gil Navarro as Santiago
 Carlos Belloso as Héctor "Lomito" Baldini
 Antonio Grimau as Guillermo
 Daniel Aráoz as Cardozo
 Ignacio Quesada as Mario
 Daniel Valenzuela as Mario father
 Marcelo Rodriguez as "el Gitano"
 Lautaro Rodríguez as Gabriel "el Tucu" Fuantes
 Melissa Giostra as Paula Baldini

Release
Puerta 7 was released on 21 February 2020 on Netflix.

References

External links
 
 

2020 Argentine television series debuts
Spanish-language Netflix original programming